Porthleven and Helston West is an electoral division of Cornwall in the United Kingdom and returns one member to sit on Cornwall Council. The current Councillor is Andrew Wallis, a member of the Independent Alliance.

Extent
Porthleven and Helston West covers the town of Porthleven and the west of the town of Helston. The division covers 1,235 hectares in total.

Election results

2017 election

2013 election

References

Helston
Electoral divisions of Cornwall Council